Republic of Korea Army College is a college located in Yuseong-gu, South Korea.

References

Yuseong District
Republic of Korea Army
Military academies of South Korea
Universities and colleges in Daejeon
Educational institutions established in 1951
1951 establishments in South Korea